In road safety management, an accident blackspot or black spot is a place where road traffic accidents have historically been concentrated. It may have occurred for a variety of reasons, such as a sharp drop or corner in a straight road, so oncoming traffic is concealed, a hidden junction on a fast road, poor or concealed warning signs at a crossroads.

For some decades treatment of accident blackspots (e.g. by signage, speed restrictions, improving sightlines, straightening bends, or speed cameras) was a mainstay of road safety policy, but current thinking has it that the benefits of these interventions are often overstated. Effects such as regression to the mean,
risk compensation
and accident migration combine to reduce the overall benefit.

In 1973, Edward Douglas-Scott-Montagu, 3rd Baron Montagu of Beaulieu said in a debate in the House of Lords:

In some cases it has been claimed that the end result of such interventions in accident blackspot areas is an increase in overall casualties. In one notable experiment, a number of accident blackspots were "treated" with a null treatment—placement of a garden gnome, according to some reports. Accident rates at these points were found to have decreased significantly in the following period, a finding which is taken as clear evidence supporting the theory of regression to the mean.

See also
 Black Spot Program

References

External links
 Discussion of accident blackspots

Road safety